Nižná may refer to several villages and municipalities in Slovakia:
 
Nižná, Piešťany District
Nižná, Tvrdošín District